Joseph Crozier (2 December 1914 – 27 July 1985) was a Scottish professional footballer who made 200 appearances in the Football League for Brentford as a goalkeeper. Crozier has been described as Brentford's best-ever goalkeeper and he is a member of the club's Hall of Fame. He represented Scotland in wartime international matches.

Playing career 
Crozier began his career at junior team Strathclyde and moved to Scottish League Second Division club East Fife in 1934. He made 100 appearances for the club and earned a £1,000 move to English top-flight club Brentford in May 1937. Either side of the Second World War, Crozier made 224 appearances for the Bees. As a testament to his longevity, Crozier made 114 of his 200 league appearances consecutively. During the war, Crozier played as a guest at Hibernian and Airdrieonians. He departed Brentford in 1949 and ended his career with spells at non-League clubs Chelmsford City, Kidderminster Harriers and Ashford Town.

International career 
Crozier won three unofficial caps for Scotland in three wartime internationals versus England in 1943 and 1944. He conceded 16 goals in three defeats. The final match at Hampden Park in April 1944 was witnessed by a wartime record 133,000 crowd.

Personal life 
Crozier served in the Royal Air Force during the Second World War. After retiring from football, he became managing director of Cory Lighterage and a Freeman of the City of London.

Career statistics

Honours 

 Brentford Hall of Fame

References

1914 births
Footballers from Coatbridge
Scottish footballers
Brentford F.C. players
English Football League players
East Fife F.C. players
Airdrieonians F.C. (1878) wartime guest players
Hibernian F.C. wartime guest players
Chelmsford City F.C. players
Southern Football League players
Association football goalkeepers
Scottish Football League players
Scotland wartime international footballers
1985 deaths
Kidderminster Harriers F.C. players
Ashford United F.C. players
Strathclyde F.C. players
Scottish Junior Football Association players
Royal Air Force personnel of World War II
Kent Football League (1894–1959) players